Droga (Polish for 'road') was a monthly magazine dedicated to literary and social topics. It was published in Nazi-occupied Warsaw from December 1943 to April 1944. Its founders were Ewa Pohoska and Juliusz Garztecki.

See also
 List of magazines in Poland

References

1943 establishments in Poland
1944 disestablishments in Poland
Defunct literary magazines published in Poland
Poland in World War II
Magazines established in 1943
Magazines disestablished in 1944
Magazines published in Warsaw
Monthly magazines published in Poland
Polish-language magazines
Polish underground press in World War II